This is a list of ambassadors of the United States to Georgia.

The United States recognized Georgia's independence on December 25, 1991, and established diplomatic relations March 29, 1993.

The U.S. Embassy in Tbilisi was established April 23, 1992, with Carey Cavanaugh as Chargé d'Affaires ad interim.

See also
Georgia–United States relations
Foreign relations of Georgia (country)
Ambassadors of the United States

References

United States Department of State: Background notes on Georgia

External links
 United States Department of State: Chiefs of Mission for Georgia
 United States Department of State: Georgia
 United States Embassy in Tbilisi

Georgia

United States